is a private university in Sayama, Saitama, Japan, established in 2004. The school also has attached middle school (in Tokyo), high school (in Tokyo), graduate school (in Sayama), junior college (in Sayama) and kindergarten (in Sayama).

History
In 1923, the high school and middle school divisions were established in Tokyo. The junior college division was established in Sayama in 1981, and the university division was started in 2004.

Courses Offered
 Pedagogy (Junior College Program)
 Communication Study (Undergraduate, Graduate, and PhD Program)

See also
Musashino Junior College
Nobuo Takahashi (President)
Matsushige Ono

References

External links

 Official website 

Educational institutions established in 2004
Private universities and colleges in Japan
Universities and colleges in Saitama Prefecture
Sayama
2004 establishments in Japan